Monique Freres (born 30 March 1957) is a Belgian gymnast. She competed in five events at the 1976 Summer Olympics.

References

External links
 

1957 births
Living people
Belgian female artistic gymnasts
Olympic gymnasts of Belgium
Gymnasts at the 1976 Summer Olympics
People from Seraing
Sportspeople from Liège Province